Eugene Collins (1822 – 10 March 1895) was an Irish Home Rule League politician.

He was elected as the Member of Parliament (MP) for Kinsale in 1874 and held the seat until it was abolished in 1885.

He had one child, Captain Harry Eugene Taunton-Collins (died 20 December 1902).

References

External links
 

1822 births
1895 deaths
Home Rule League MPs
Members of the Parliament of the United Kingdom for County Cork constituencies (1801–1922)
UK MPs 1874–1880
UK MPs 1880–1885